

Countess of Lippe

House of Lippe, 1528–1613

Countess of Lippe-Detmold

House of Lippe, 1613–1789

Countess of Lippe-Alverdissen

House of Lippe, 1613–1640 and 1681–1777

Countess of Lippe-Brake

House of Lippe, 1613–1709

Countess of Lippe-Biesterfeld

House of Lippe, 1762–1905

Countess of Lippe-Weissenfeld

House of Lippe, 1762–1882?

Countess of Schaumburg-Lippe

House of Lippe, 1640–1807

Princess of Lippe

House of Lippe, 1789–1918

Princess of Schaumburg-Lippe

House of Lippe, 1807–1918

Titular Princess of Lippe

House of Lippe, 1918-present

Titular Princess of Schaumburg-Lippe

House of Lippe, 1918-present

Sources 

 
 
House of Lippe
Lippe
Lippe